The Auckland Warriors 1999 season was the Auckland Warriors 5th first-grade season. The club competed in Australasia's National Rugby League. The coach of the team was Mark Graham while Matthew Ridge was the club's captain.

Milestones
13 March – Round 2: Tony Tatupu plays his 50th match for the club.
21 March – Round 3: Brady Malam plays his 50th match for the club.
16 May – Round 11: Tony Tuimavave plays his 50th match for the club.
30 May – Round 13: Logan Swann plays his 50th match for the club.
21 August – Round 25: Stacey Jones becomes the first player to appear in 100 first-grade games for the club.

Jersey & Sponsors
 For 1999 the Warriors again used a similar style of jersey, produced by Nike, Inc., with Vodafone the shirt sponsor and Bartercard as sleeve sponsor.

Sale to Tainui
Between the 1998 and 1999 seasons the Auckland Rugby League sold the Auckland Warriors to a consortium that included majority investor the Tainui tribe as well as Graham Lowe and Malcolm Boyle. The new owners cleaned out the management and coaching structures and also straightened the tongue on the Warriors logo, as a curved tongue is believed to be cursed in Māori culture.

The consortium paid $2 million in cash, $1.5 million in deferred settlement over three years and an annual development grant of $250,000. The Auckland Rugby League was forced to write off the deferred settlement in 2000 when the Auckland Warriors folded and the assets were purchased by the New Zealand Warriors.

Fixtures 

The Warriors used Ericsson Stadium as their home ground in 1999, their only home ground since they entered the competition in 1995.

Country Carnival

Regular season

Ladder

Squad 

Thirty two players were used by the Warriors in 1999, including eight players making their first grade debuts.

Staff
Chief executive officer: Trevor McKewen
Football manager: Hugh McGahan

Coaching Staff
Head coach: Mark Graham
Assistant coach: Mike McClennan

Transfers

Gains

Mid-Season Gains

Losses

Mid-Season Losses

Other Teams
During the 1999 season players not selected for first grade competed in the NZRL's National Provincial competition. The Warriors also sent four players a week to play for the Wynnum Manly Seagulls and Brisbane Souths.

Awards
Jason Death won the club's Player of the Year award.

References

External links
Warriors official site
1999 Warriors Season at rugbyleagueproject.org

New Zealand Warriors seasons
Auckland Warriors season
War